The 2017 Korean Tour was the seventh season of the Korean Tour to carry Official World Golf Ranking points. The season consisted of 19 events, two of which were co-sanctioned by the OneAsia Tour and one by the Asian Tour. All the tournament had prize funds of at least 300 million won (approximately US$290,000). Seven had prize funds of 1 billion won ($960,000) or more.

European Tour strategic alliance
In May, it was announced that the European Tour had entered into a strategic alliance with the Korean PGA. As part of the alliance, it saw the leading player (not otherwise exempt) on the Korean Tour Order of Merit gain European Tour status for the following season.

Schedule
The following table lists official events during the 2017 season.

Order of Merit
The Order of Merit was titled as the Genesis Points and was based on prize money won during the season, calculated using a points-based system. The leading player on the tour (not otherwise exempt) earned status to play on the 2018 European Tour.

Notes

References

External links

2017 Korean Tour
2017 in golf
2017 in South Korean sport